"Don't Lie" is a 2005 song by the Black Eyed Peas.

Don't Lie may also refer to:

Don't Lie (film), a 1942 Our Gang short comedy film
"Don't Lie" (Trace Adkins song), 1999
"Don't Lie", a song by the Murmurs from Pristine Smut, 1997
"Don't Lie", a song by Nik Kershaw, B-side of the single "Don Quixote", 1985
"Don't Lie", a song by Snakefinger from Greener Postures, 1980
"Don't Lie", a song from Wow! Wow! Wubbzy!, 2009